Philip Iverson (26 January 1965 – 13 August 2006) was a Canadian expressionist painter who gained national attention for his artistry.

He was born in Fredericton, New Brunswick and graduated from Mount Allison University with a Bachelor of Fine Arts degree in 1990. In addition to his painting, he was an art instructor at the New Brunswick College of Craft and Design and after his move to Montreal in 2001, he taught at the Saidye Bronfman Centre. Iverson painted a beautiful picture of trains, which is still today hung in Fredericton High School, the high school from which he graduated.

Iverson died in Montreal at age 41 from brain cancer.

References

External links
Philip Iverson official site, retrieved 31 March 2012
Legacy.com: Philip Iverson obituary, retrieved 16 August 2006
Philip Iverson works at Ingrid Mueller gallery in Fredericton, NB (some work from his estate is in their storage - personal communication)
Philip painting in his studio
 

1965 births
2006 deaths
Deaths from brain tumor
20th-century Canadian painters
Canadian male painters
21st-century Canadian painters
Artists from New Brunswick
Expressionist painters
People from Fredericton
Deaths from cancer in Quebec
Neurological disease deaths in Quebec
20th-century Canadian male artists
21st-century Canadian male artists